WCYE (93.7 FM, "Coyote 93.7") is a radio station licensed to serve Three Lakes, Wisconsin, United States. The station is owned by Jim and Diane Coursolle's Heartland Communications Group and the broadcast license is held by Heartland Comm. License, LLC. The station shares studios with WNWX WRJO and WERL on North Railroad Street in Eagle River, and its transmitter is located along Thunder Lake Road between Sugar Camp and Three Lakes.

WCYE broadcasts a country music format.

The station was assigned the call sign WCYE by the Federal Communications Commission on March 13, 2008.

References

External links
Official Website

CYE
Country radio stations in the United States
Oneida County, Wisconsin